The Wisseloord Studio is a recording studio in Hilversum, Netherlands. It was officially opened on 19 January 1978 by Prince Claus. The studios were founded by electronics company Philips, to enable their PolyGram artists to record in a professional environment. Initially, there were three studios, but this was expanded to five.

In the early days, the studios were mainly used by Dutch artists. Later, international musicians such as Elton John, Scorpions, Orchestral Manoeuvres in the Dark, Def Leppard, Iron Maiden, the Police, Tina Turner, Electric Light Orchestra, and U2 have used the facilities.

Beginning in 2010, Ronald Prent, Darcy Proper and Paul Reynolds teamed with designer and acoustician Jochen Veith to begin a major refit of the studios. Prent, who was an assistant at Wisseloord in 1981, had been envisioning a new studio model with two identical control rooms, so it would be easier to move between them. As part of this, major components have been updated, including the integration of new mixing consoles from Automated Processes, Inc. (Vision) and Avid (Euphonix System5). The studios also include a PMC active monitoring system. The studio reopened on 25 March 2012.

According to Andrew Davie of the band Bear's Den, "The main rooms at Wisseloord are these enormous, spaceship-style studios."

Artists who recorded at Wisseloord 

 3 Doors Down
 50 Cent
 Akon
 Alain Clark
 Ali Campbell
 Alceu Valença
 André Rieu
 André van Duin
 Andrea Bocelli
 Anouk
 Axxis
 BZN
 Barclay James Harvest
 Bastiaan Ragas
 The Beautiful South
 Benny Neyman
 Benny Sings
 BLØF
 Boudewijn de Groot
 Cactus World News
 Casiopea
 Channel Zero
 Cristina Deutekom
 Clark Datchler
 Clouseau
 Danger Danger
 Dave Edmunds
 David Knopfler
 David Lee Roth
 David Soul
 David Sylvian
 De Dijk
 Def Leppard
 Dieter Falk
 D-A-D
 Do
 Dr. Hook & The Medicine Show
 Duncan Laurence
 Edsilia Rombley
 Elton John 
 Electric Eel Shock
 Electric Light Orchestra
 Elvis Costello and the Attractions
 Epica
 Erik Hulzebosch
 Foo Fighters
 Francis Goya
 Frank Boeijen
 Frankie Goes To Hollywood
 Gerard Joling
 Gert Bettens
 Gheorghe Zamfir
 Glennis Grace
 Gloria Estefan
 Go West
 Gordon
 Gotthard
 Greyson Chance
 HammerFall
 Hartmann
 Harry Sacksioni
 Herman Brood
 Herman van Veen
 Hollywood Undead
 Imperiet
 Indochine
 Iron Maiden
 James Blunt
 Jan Smit
 Jeff Lynne
 Jessica Sanchez
 Jett Rebel
 Jo Lemaire
 Judas Priest
 Kane
 Kayak
 Killing Joke
 Kingdom Come
 Klaus Hoffmann
 Klaus Lage Band
 Krezip
 Laura Fygi
 Lee Towers
 Lionel Richie
 Loïs Lane
 Lucie Silvas
 Luv'
 Magnum
 Manowar
 Marque
 Metallica
 Michael Jackson
 Mick Jagger
 Mike Batt
 Miriam Makeba
 Misia
 Noa
 The Nits
 Noordkaap
 Normaal
 Orchestral Manoeuvres in the Dark
 Opus
 Paco de Lucía
 Paul de Leeuw
 Paul McCartney
 Paul Young
 Peter Maffay
 Peter Sarstedt
 Phil Collins
 The Police 
 Quadrophonia
 Queensrÿche
 Racoon
 Rammstein
 Raymond van het Groenewoud
 René Froger
 Robert Palmer
 Robin S.
 Rood Adeo
 Ruth Jacott
 Sade
 Salada de Frutas
 Sarah Bettens
 Saxon
 Scorpions
 Shirley Bassey
 Simple Minds
 Simply Red
 Sinéad O'Connor
 Sopa de Cabra
 Soulsister
 Spider Murphy Gang
 Status Quo
 Stereophonics
 Sting
 Technotronic
 Telly Savalas
 Ten Sharp
 The Gathering
 The Cranberries
 The Sisters of Mercy
 The Three Degrees
 The Stranglers
 The Undertones
 Thomas Anders
 Tina Turner
 Tony Carey
 Toots Thielemans
 T'Pau
 Treat
 Trijntje Oosterhuis
 U2
 UB40
 Valensia
 Van Dik Hout
 Victory
 Willy DeVille
 Within Temptation
 Chew Fu
 Youp van 't Hek
 Zucchero
 Zinatra

References

External links 
 www.wisseloord.nl

Recording studios in the Netherlands
1978 establishments in the Netherlands
Mass media in Hilversum
Music in Hilversum
Philips
20th-century architecture in the Netherlands